The Portugal national under-17 football team represents Portugal in international football at this age level and is controlled by Federação Portuguesa de Futebol, the governing body for football in Portugal.

Competitive record

FIFA U-17 World Cup

UEFA European U-17 Championship

*Denotes draws include knockout matches decided on penalty kicks.
Gold background color indicates first-place finish. Silver background color indicates second-place finish. Bronze background color indicates third-place finish.

Recent results

Current squad
 The following players were called up for the 2023 UEFA European Under-17 Championship qualification matches.
 Match dates: 16, 19 and 22 November 2022
 Opposition: ,  and 
 Caps and goals correct as of: 19 October 2022, after the match against

Former squads
FIFA U-17 World Championship
1995 FIFA U-17 World Championship squads - Portugal
2003 FIFA U-17 World Championship squads - Portugal

UEFA European Under-17
2002 UEFA European Under-17 Football Championship squads - Portugal
2003 UEFA European Under-17 Football Championship squads - Portugal
2004 UEFA European Under-17 Football Championship squads - Portugal
2010 UEFA European Under-17 Football Championship squads - Portugal
2014 UEFA European Under-17 Football Championship squads - Portugal
2016 UEFA European Under-17 Football Championship squads - Portugal

Most appearances

Most goals

References

European national under-17 association football teams
F